Mary Catherine Murphy (born October 25, 1939) is an American politician and former member of the Minnesota House of Representatives. She is a retired history and social studies teacher at Duluth Central High School in Duluth (1964–97). She is active in historical preservation and works as a grounds manager.

Murphy was first elected in 1976, and was reelected every two years through 2020. Before the 1982 legislative redistricting, she represented District 14B, and before the 2002 redistricting, she represented District 8A. She was chair of the Ethics Committee during the 2007–08 and 2009–10 biennia.

Murphy chaired the House Labor-Management Relations Subcommittee for Negotiation, General Labor and Legislation from 1979 to 1982, the Commerce and Economic Development Subcommittee for Commerce and Job Creation during the 1983–84 biennium, the Labor-Management Relations Subcommittee for the Unemployment Insurance and Workers Compensation Division during the 1987–88 biennium, the Economic Development Subcommittee for the Rural Resource Development Division during the 1989–90 biennium, the Energy Committee during the 1991–92 biennium, the Judiciary Subcommittee for the Judiciary Finance Division from 1993 to 1998, and the Finance Subcommittee for the Education Finance and Economic Competitiveness Finance Division during the 2007–08 biennium. She was an assistant minority leader during the 2001–02 biennium.

Murphy graduated from Hermantown High School in Hermantown, then in 1961 the College of St. Scholastica in Duluth, with a B.A. in history. She later attended graduate school at Indiana University, Macalester College, American University, the University of Wisconsin in Superior, and the University of Minnesota in Duluth. She is a former member of the Minnesota delegation to the Great Lakes Commission and served on the Minnesota Statehood Sesquicentennial Commission from 2006 to 2008.

Murphy's key legislative concerns included labor and union advocacy, women’s economic issues, education, consumer protection, health care, criminal justice, jobs, and capitol projects.

References

External links 

 Rep. Murphy web page
 Minnesota Public Radio Votetracker: Rep. Mary Murphy
 Project Votesmart - Rep. Mary Murphy profile

1939 births
Living people
People from Hermantown, Minnesota
Politicians from Duluth, Minnesota
Democratic Party members of the Minnesota House of Representatives
Women state legislators in Minnesota
College of St. Scholastica alumni
21st-century American politicians
21st-century American women politicians